100 of the World's Worst Invasive Alien Species is a list of invasive species compiled in 2014 by the Global Invasive Species Database, a database of invasive species around the world. The database is run by the Invasive Species Specialist Group (ISSG) of the International Union for Conservation of Nature (IUCN). The ISSG acknowledges that it is "very difficult to identify 100 invasive species from around the world that really are 'worse' than any others."

Criteria for inclusion 
Two criteria were used in selecting items for the list:
 An invasive species' "serious impact on biological diversity and/or human activities" and
 That species' "illustration of important issues surrounding biological invasion"

According to the ISSG, "only one species from each genus was selected."

List of species 

Notes

External links
100 of the World's Worst Invasive Alien Species's observations on the map - iNaturalist
100 of the World's Worst Invasive Alien Species List - iNaturalist

References

2014-related lists
Lists of invasive species
Lists of worsts